The Maywood Woman's Club, also known as the American Woman's League Building, located in Corning, Tehama County, California.

The 1909 clubhouse was designed in Bungalow style by St. Louis architects Helfensteller, Hirsch & Watson as a "chapter house" for the American Woman's League.

It was listed on the National Register of Historic Places in 1992.

See also
 National Register of Historic Places listings in Tehama County, California

References

Women's club buildings in California
Buildings and structures in Tehama County, California
Clubs and societies in California
Women's clubs in the United States
Buildings and structures completed in 1909
Clubhouses on the National Register of Historic Places in California
National Register of Historic Places in Tehama County, California
Bungalow architecture in California
American Woman's League
History of women in California